Ricky Woods (born July 27, 1984) is an American former professional basketball player for the Akita Northern Happinets of the Japanese bj league. On November 1, 2007, he was selected by the Idaho Stampede with the 29th overall pick in the 2007 NBA D-League draft.

College statistics

|-
| style="text-align:left;"| 2002-03
| style="text-align:left;"| Norfolk State
| 29 ||1  ||18.3  || .540 || .091 || .483|| 3.59 ||0.62  || 1.03 || 0.97|| 6.66
|-
| style="text-align:left;"| 2003-04
| style="text-align:left;"| Paris JC
|  ||  ||  ||  ||  || || ||  || ||  || 
|-
| style="text-align:left;"| 2004-05
| style="text-align:left;"| Southeastern Louisiana
| 33 ||31  ||30.1  || .559 || .250 || .652||6.79  ||0.94  || 1.70 || 0.79 || 17.15
|-
| style="text-align:left;"| 2005-06
| style="text-align:left;"| Southeastern Louisiana
| 26 ||24  ||31.0  || .498 || .250 || .644|| 10.08 ||1.96  || 1.65 || 1.27 ||16.19
|-
|- class="sortbottom"
! style="text-align:center;" colspan=2|  Career

!88 ||56 || 26.5 ||.534  || .158 ||.619  || 6.70 ||1.14  || 1.47 ||0.99  || 13.41
|-

NCAA Awards & Honors
Southland Player of the Year - 2006
All-Southland First Team - 2005, 2006
Southland Tournament MVP - 2005
Southland All-Tournament Team - 2005
Southland Newcomer of the Year - 2005

Career statistics

Regular season 

|-
| align="left" |  2005-06
| align="left" | Cantabria
| 1 ||  || 14.0 || .600 || .500 || .000 || 2.0 || 0.0 || 1.0 || 0.0 ||  7.0
|-
| align="left" |  2005-06
| align="left" | Ginásio
| 32 ||  || 37.1 || .492 || .278 || .682 || 7.7 || 2.1 || 2.8 || 0.8 ||  20.4
|-
|-
| align="left" |  2009-10
| align="left" | Oita
| 50 || 49 || 34.4 || .487 || .194 || .592 || 11.7 || 3.3 || 2.1 || 0.6 ||  24.1
|-
| align="left" |  2010-11
| align="left" | Ramla
| 4 ||  || 27.3 || .457 || .333 || .533 || 6.0 || 1.3 || 0.8 || 1.0 ||  13.3
|-
| align="left" |  2011-12
| align="left" | Toros
| 2 || 1 || 13.0 || .286 || .000 || .750 || 3.00 || 0.50 || 0.50 || 0.00 ||  3.50
|-
| align="left" |  2011-12
| align="left" | Akita
| 41 || 36 || 30.4 || .454 || .174 || .665 || 9.7 || 3.8 || 1.5 || 0.4 ||  20.6
|-
| align="left" |  2012-13
| align="left" | Miyazaki/Tokyo CR
| 41 || 31 || 34.1 || .406 || .256 || .737 || 9.9 || 4.0 || 1.7 || 0.3 ||  21.9
|-
| align="left" |  2013-14
| align="left" | Tokyo CR
| 45 ||  || 36.3 || .423 || .207 || .686 || 8.9 || 3.4 || 1.7 || 0.3 ||  21.4
|-

Playoffs 

|-
|style="text-align:left;"|2006-07
|style="text-align:left;"|Cantabria
| 4 ||  || 13.3|| .400 || .500 || .625 || 3.5 || 0.3 || 0.3 || 0.0 || 6.0
|-
|style="text-align:left;"|2011-12
|style="text-align:left;"|Akita
| 4 ||  || 27.5 || .458 || .000 || .750 || 7.0 || 3.0 || 2.3 || 0.5|| 18.0
|-

External links
Akita vs Nagano
Woods of Akita

References

1984 births
Living people
Akita Northern Happinets players
American expatriate basketball people in Israel
American expatriate basketball people in Japan
American expatriate basketball people in Mexico
American expatriate basketball people in Poland
American expatriate basketball people in Portugal
American expatriate basketball people in Spain
American men's basketball players
Basketball players from New Orleans
Cantabria Baloncesto players
Ehime Orange Vikings players
Forwards (basketball)
Hapoel Be'er Sheva B.C. players
Liga ACB players
Miyazaki Shining Suns players
Norfolk State Spartans men's basketball players
Paris Dragons basketball players
Southeastern Louisiana Lions basketball players
Stal Ostrów Wielkopolski players
Tokyo Cinq Rêves players
Toros de Nuevo Laredo players